Events in the year 1972 in Italy.

Incumbents
President - Giovanni Leone
Prime Minister – Emilio Colombo (until 17 February); Giulio Andreotti (from 17 February)

Events
7 May – In the 1972 Italian general election, the Christian Democracy Party (DC) retains its position with around 38% of the votes
21 August-3 September - 33rd Venice International Film Festival

Sport

Basketball
1971–72 Serie A (basketball)
1972–73 Serie A (basketball)

Cycling
1972 Giro d'Italia
1972 UCI Road World Championships

Football
1971–72 Serie A
1972–73 Serie A
1971–72 Serie B
1972–73 Serie B

Motor racing
1972 Italian Grand Prix

Births
29 February
 Antonio Sabàto, Jr., Italian actor
 Sylvie Lubamba, Italian showgirl
6 June – Cristina Scabbia, singer
12 July – Gabriel Garko, actor and fashion model
8 September – Giovanni Frezza, actor
21 October – Ilaria Latini, voice actress
21 November – Maria Cristina Correnti, basketball player

Date unknown
Enzo Celli, dancer, choreographer and dance company artistic director

Deaths
2 January – Mauro Scoccimarro, economist and politician (born 1895)
29 February – Pietro Ubaldi, author, teacher and philosopher (born 1886)  
11 August – Teresa Franchini, actress (born 1877)

See also
 1972 in Italian television
 List of Italian films of 1972

References

 
Years of the 20th century in Italy
1970s in Italy
Italy
Italy